Joe Toleman (26 September 1921 – 15 May 2009) was an Australian rules footballer who played with Collingwood in the Victorian Football League (VFL).

Notes

External links 
	
		
Profile on Collingwood Forever	

		

1921 births		
2009 deaths				
Australian rules footballers from Victoria (Australia)		
Collingwood Football Club players
Ivanhoe Amateurs Football Club players
Hamilton Football Club players